The National Street Rod Association or NSRA is an organization that hosts a number of Hot Rod and Muscle Car shows in the United States.

History
The editors of Rod and Custom magazine joined with street-rod clubs across the country to organize the first Street Rod Nationals in 1970, leading to the formation of the NSRA. Initially, the NSRA required that cars had to be manufactured before 1948. The rule was changed in 2010 to admit cars that are at least 30 years old.

Shows
The shows that are put on by the NSRA are:

References

External links
NSRA Online

Motor clubs
Clubs and societies in the United States